Lim Tang Boon is a Singaporean football midfielder who played for Singapore in the 1984 Asian Cup.

In 1980, Lim was voted player of the year.

On 26 December 1980, in a group match against North Korea during Singapore's 1982 FIFA World Cup qualification campaign, Fandi Ahmad earned a penalty against North Korea. Lim took the penalty kick which the North Korean goalkeeper saved. Singapore lost the match 1-0 and fail to quality beyond the group stage.

Personal life 
Lim worked at Hongkong and Shanghai Banking Corp from 1976 to 1992

In 1997, Lim was sentenced to two-year jail for taking $360,000 from an account at Hongkong and Shanghai Banking Corp in 1991 where he worked at.

References

External links
Stats

Year of birth missing (living people)
Living people
Singaporean footballers
Singapore international footballers
Singaporean sportspeople of Chinese descent
1984 AFC Asian Cup players
Southeast Asian Games silver medalists for Singapore
Southeast Asian Games medalists in football
Association football midfielders
Competitors at the 1983 Southeast Asian Games